Egotrip may refer to:
 Egotrip (band), a Brazilian 1980s pop/rock band
 Egotrip (album), the band's self-titled only album
 "Egotrip", a song by Brazilian new wave band Blitz

See also
 Ego Trip (disambiguation)
 Ego Tripping (disambiguation)